Van Richten's Guide to Werebeasts is an accessory for the 2nd edition of the Advanced Dungeons & Dragons fantasy role-playing game, published in 1993.

Contents

Publication history

Reception

Reviews
White Wolf #45

References

Ravenloft supplements
Role-playing game supplements introduced in 1993